Hare Valley is an unincorporated community in Northampton County on the Eastern Shore of the U.S. state of Virginia. Monroe Work documented it among African American towns and settlements in his publications.

References

Unincorporated communities in Virginia
Unincorporated communities in Northampton County, Virginia